Art:21 - Art in the 21st Century is a PBS series, educational resource, archive, and history of contemporary art. It premiered in 2001, and is now broadcast in over 50 countries worldwide. Premiering a new season every two years, Art:21 is the only series on United States television to focus exclusively on contemporary visual art and artists. It is a nonprofit organization founded in 1997 to make contemporary art more accessible to the public, and to document 21st-century art and artists from the artists' own perspectives. Their overall goal is to raise the profile of major players in the world of contemporary art and to encourage creativity. The main office is located in New York City.
Art 21’s purpose is to communicate each artist’s intimacy through the process of their work and reveal an approachable perception involved in their observation, description, analysis, and synthesis on their work for the understandable and universal accessibility to all. It inaugurates and allows a more familiar aspect into art creation beyond individualized, distinctive, and personal conceptions.

Projects 
The Art21 organization's current projects include their PBS television series, education, public programs & outreach, online resources (including Art21 Blog), and the publishing of books.

Art21 Blog is written by writers and contributors and since 2008, has featured posts written by guest writers.

Season synopsis
Each season is separated into episodes by themes. Each theme showcases artists that fit into that niche in some fashion.

Season one (2001):
Place – Introduction by artist Laurie Anderson. Featured artists are Richard Serra, Sally Mann, Margaret Kilgallen, Barry McGee, and Pepon Osorio.
Spirituality – Introduction by Beryl Korot and S. Epatha Merkerson. Featured artists are Ann Hamilton, John Feodorov, Shahzia Sikander, and James Turrell.
Identity – Introduction by comedian Steve Martin, and artist, William Wegman. Featured artists are Bruce Nauman, Kerry James Marshall, Maya Lin, and Louise Bourgeois.
Consumption – Introduction by artist Barbara Kruger, and former professional tennis player John McEnroe. Featured artists are Michael Ray Charles, Matthew Barney, Andrea Zittel, and Mel Chin.

Season two (2003):
Stories – Introduction by filmmaker John Waters (directed by Charles Atlas). Featured artists are Kara Walker, Kiki Smith, Do-Ho Suh, and Trenton Doyle Hancock.
Loss and Desire – Introduction by four-time Oscar-nominated actress Jane Anderson (directed by Charles Atlas). Featured artists are Collier Schorr, Gabriel Orozco, and Janine Antoni.
Humor – Introduction by comedian Margaret Cho. (directed by Charles Atlas) Featured artists are Eleanor Antin, Raymond Pettibon, Elizabeth Murray, and Walton Ford.
Time – Introduction by dancer/choreographer Merce Cunningham. (directed by Charles Atlas) Featured artists are Martin Puryear, Paul Pfeiffer, Vija Celmins, and Tim Hawkinson.

Season three (2005):
Power – Introduction by actor David Alan Grier. Featured artists are Cai Guo-Qiang, Laylah Ali, Krzysztof Wodiczko, Ida Applebroog, Teresa Hubbard / Alexander Birchler.
Memory – Introduction by actress Isabella Rossellini. Featured artists are Susan Rothenberg, Mike Kelley, Hiroshi Sugimoto, Josiah McElheny, Teresa Hubbard / Alexander Birchler.
Play – Introduction by basketball player Grant Hill. Featured artists are Jessica Stockholder, Oliver Herring, Arturo Herrera, Ellen Gallagher, Teresa Hubbard / Alexander Birchler.
Structures – Introduction by actor Sam Waterston. Featured artists are Matthew Ritchie, Fred Wilson, Richard Tuttle, Roni Horn, Teresa Hubbard / Alexander Birchler.

Season four (2007):
Romance – Featured artists are Laurie Simmons, Lari Pittman, Judy Pfaff, and Pierre Huyghe.
Protest – Featured artists are Nancy Spero, An-My Lê, Alfredo Jaar, and Jenny Holzer.
Ecology – Featured artists are Ursula von Rydingsvard, Iñigo Manglano-Ovalle, Robert Adams, and Mark Dion.
Paradox – Featured artists are Mark Bradford, Catherine Sullivan, Robert Ryman, Jennifer Allora and Guillermo Calzadilla.

Season five (2009):
Compassion – Featured artists are William Kentridge, Doris Salcedo and Carrie Mae Weems.
Fantasy – Featured artists are Cao Fei, Mary Heilmann, Jeff Koons, and Florian Maier-Aichen.
Transformation – Featured artists are Paul McCarthy, Cindy Sherman, Yinka Shonibare.
Systems – Featured artists are Julie Mehretu, John Baldessari, Kimsooja, and Allan McCollum.

Season six (2012):
Change – Featured artists are Ai Weiwei, Catherine Opie, and El Anatsui.
Boundaries – Featured artists are assume vivid astro focus, David Altmejd, Lynda Benglis, and Tabaimo.
History – Featured artists are Glenn Ligon, Marina Abramović, and Mary Reid Kelley.
Balance – Featured artists are Rackstraw Downes, Robert Mangold, and Sarah Sze.

Season seven (2014):
Investigation (10/24) – Featured artists are Thomas Hirschhorn, Graciela Iturbide, Leonardo Drew.
Secrets (10/31) – Featured artists are Elliott Hundley, Arlene Shechet, Trevor Paglen.
Legacy (11/7) – Featured artists are Tania Bruguera, Abraham Cruzvillegas, Wolfgang Laib.
Fiction (11/14) – Featured artists are Katharina Grosse, Joan Jonas, Omer Fast.

Season eight (2016):
In May 2016 the schedule for an eighth season was announced, air dates to start in September of that year. Actress Claire Danes hosts each episode of the eighth season, each focusing on one of four North American cities: Chicago, Los Angeles, Mexico City, and Vancouver.
Chicago (9/16) – Featured artists are Nick Cave (performance artist), Theaster Gates, Barbara Kasten, Chris Ware.
Mexico City (9/16) – Featured artists are Natalia Almada, Minerva Cuevas, Damián Ortega, Pedro Reyes.
Los Angeles (9/23) – Featured artists are Ed Arceneaux, Liz Larner, Tala Madani, Diana Thater.
Vancouver (9/23) – Featured artists are Stan Douglas, Brian Jungen, Liz Magor, Jeff Wall.

Season nine (2018):
Johannesburg – Featured artists are Robin Rhode, David Goldblatt, Zanele Muholi, Nicholas Hlobo.
Berlin – Featured artists are Olafur Eliasson, Nathalie Djurberg & Hans Berg, Susan Philipsz, Hiwa K.
San Francisco Bay Area – Featured artists are Stephanie Syjuco, Katy Grannan, Lynn Hershman Leeson, Creative Growth Art Center. 

Season ten (2020):
London – Featured artists are John Akomfrah, Phyllida Barlow, Anish Kapoor, and Christian Marclay.
Beijing – Featured artists are Guan Xiao, Liu Xiaodong, Song Dong & Yin Xiuzhen, and Xu Bing.
The Borderlands – Featured artists are Tanya Aguiñiga, Rafael Lozano-Hemmer, Richard Misrach, and Postcommodity.

Press 

Awards:
 George Foster Peabody Award
 Platinum Best in Show from the Aurora Awards
 Gold Remi from the 41st WorldFest Independent Film Festival
 Silver Hugo from the 44th Hugo Television Awards
 Silver Screen from the 41st U.S. International Film and Video Festival
 Emmy Nomination for Outstanding Artistic and Cultural Programming
 Gold Hugo Award from the Chicago International Television Competition
 CINE Golden Eagle Award
 Gold Award from Aurora Film Festival
 Bronze Remi Award from World Fest Houston International Film Festival

Festivals:
 Festival International du Film Sur L'Art (FIFA)
 Arte Cinema: Festival Internationale di Film sull' Arte Contemporanea

Conferences:
National Arts Education Association (NAEA) Annual Convention: 2011 keynote presentation with Janine Antoni and Oliver Herring; 2009 keynote presentation with Mark Bradford; 2007 presentation of the Youth Engagement initiative; 2006 keynote speech by artist Krzysztof Wodiczko, all-day screening salon, and super session panel presentation showcasing Art21 in the classroom; 2005 screening event in collaboration with The Institute of Contemporary Art/Boston.
 National Center for Outreach (NCO) Conference: Annual PBS Pipeline presentation: 2004 panel session explored using the arts to address community issues.
 Grant-makers in the Art Annual Conference: Armchair discussion with artists and educators about Art21, education, and new media.
 Arts Education Partnership(AEP) Professional Development Forum: Workshop presented Art21 and opportunities to support professional development in arts education.

Additional conferences:
New York City Art Teachers Association/United Federation of Teachers (NYCATA/UFT) Annual Conference
Colorado Art Education Association (CAEA) Annual Conference
Art Educators of New Jersey (AENJ) Annual Conference
New Jersey Education Association (NJEA)
National Education Telecommunications Association

Advisory councils 
Art21 has 4 advisory councils that specialize in different aspects, but who all work to further the aspirations of the organization.
 The Curatorial Council A nationally based group that helps to set the basis for each of the Art:21 - Art in the 21st Century seasons.
 Education Advisory Council A group of nationally recognized educators in K-12, higher education and museum education that contribute insight in strategic planning to support Art21's core education mission.
 The Humanities Advisory Council A group of Humanities scholars who aim to help establish a relationship between visual art and humanities disciplines.
 The International Council An international group of scholars, arts professionals, museum directors, critics and curators that supports Art21's global commitment to education and access.

References

Sources 

PBS Art:21 - Art in the 21st Century Page

Non-profit organizations based in New York City
PBS original programming
2001 American television series debuts
2000s American documentary television series
2010s American documentary television series
English-language television shows
Contemporary art